Bruno Bongongo (born June 30, 1985) is an amateur boxer from the Central African Republic. Bongongo fought for the Central African Republic at the 2008 Summer Olympics, losing to Cameroon's Joseph Mulema in the opening round welterweight contest.

References

1985 births
Living people
Welterweight boxers
Central African Republic male boxers
Boxers at the 2008 Summer Olympics
Olympic boxers of the Central African Republic